An Ethiopian suit or Eritrean suit is the name given in America to the traditional formal wear of the men of Ethiopia and Eritrea. It consists of a long sleeve, knee-length shirt, and matching pants. Most shirts are made with a Mandarin, band, or Nehru collar. The suit is made of chiffon, which is a sheer silk or rayon cloth.  A shawl called a netela or a kuta is wrapped around the suit. During the opening ceremony of each Summer Olympics during Parade of Nations, the Ethiopian team marched in white suits.

For informal events, men wear the Ethiopian dashiki.  The main difference between the dashiki and Ethiopian and Eritrean suits is the collar.  The dashiki does not have a collar. The dashiki is similar to the style worn in West Africa.  However, Ethiopian and Eritrean dashikis are usually white, off-white, or natural cotton. The front is decorated with Ethiopian and Eritrean themes and motifs.  For formal events, the dashiki suit is worn and consists of a dashiki shirt and matching pants. (see Wikimedia commons for photos)

In the United States and the Caribbean, Ethiopian and Eritrean suits is also worn by  Rastafarian men.

Ethiopian and Eritrean suits is worn for weddings, church and synagogue services, and other special occasions.

See also
Bernos
Dashiki
Gabi
Culture of Ethiopia
Culture of Eritrea
Coffee ceremony
Habesha kemis

References

Suits (clothing)
Ethiopian clothing
Eritrean clothing
Folk costumes